Leander is an unincorporated community in Johnson County, Kentucky, United States. It is part of the 41222 ZIP Code Tabulation Area, which includes the nearby community of Hager Hill. Leander is located at an elevation of 669 feet.

References

Unincorporated communities in Johnson County, Kentucky
Unincorporated communities in Kentucky